is a Japanese manga author best known for the high school series Special A.

Career
Minami was born in Saitama Prefecture in Japan.

In 2001, her short story  received an Honourable Mention for Hakusensha's 25th Athena awards.  She debuted in Hana to Yume'''s October 2001 issue with a short story titled .

Maki Minami's longest running series, Special A, began publication in 2003 and ended in 2009.  Her subsequent series, Seiyū ka-! began serialization in Hana to Yume in 2009, after the completion of Special A.  Her recent works also include the oneshot , which appeared in the April 2009 edition of The Hana to Yume.

On October 28, 2022, Minami will launch a new series titled Hisureba, Hana in Hakusensha's Melody'' magazine as part of the magazine's 25th anniversary.

Works

Manga

References

External links 
  Interview featuring Maki Minami 

Year of birth missing (living people)
Manga artists from Saitama Prefecture
Living people
Women manga artists
Japanese female comics artists
Female comics writers
21st-century Japanese women writers
21st-century Japanese writers